Eduardo de la Riva (born 11 June 1982) is a Spanish professional golfer.

De la Riva turned professional in 2001. He joined the European Tour via qualifying school for 2003, but failed to keep his card. Since then, he has played mainly on the Challenge Tour, occasionally qualifying for local European Tour events. His best position on the European Tour was T-2, three times. In 2011, de la Riva won the Order of Merit on the Peugeot Tour, a Spanish national golf tour.  On the Challenge Tour, he won the 2012 Fred Olsen Challenge de España.

Amateur wins
Spanish Under 12 Championship
Spanish Boys Championship (twice)
Spanish Junior Championship (twice)

Professional wins (2)

Challenge Tour wins (1)

Other wins (1)
2002 one Peugeot Oki Tour event

Playoff record
European Tour playoff record (0–1)

Results in major championships

CUT = missed the half-way cut
"T" = tied

Team appearances
Amateur
Eisenhower Trophy (representing Spain): 2000
Jacques Léglise Trophy (representing the Continent of Europe): 2000

See also
2012 European Tour Qualifying School graduates
2014 European Tour Qualifying School graduates

References

External links

Spanish male golfers
Golfers from Catalonia
European Tour golfers
Sportspeople from Barcelona
1982 births
Living people
20th-century Spanish people
21st-century Spanish people